Priyadarshana is a Sinhalese surname. Notable people with this name include: 

Mahesh Priyadarshana (born 1981)
Nalin Priyadarshana (born 1990)
Nuwan Priyadarshana (born 1993)

Sinhalese surnames